The Klimaschutz- und Energie-Beratungsagentur Heidelberg-Nachbargemeinden gGmbH (Climate Protection and Energy Advice Agency Heidelberg and neighboring municipalities), also called KliBA, is an independent non-profit organization founded on March 17, 1997 under the objective of assisting citizens, companies and municipalities in the Rhine-Neckar Metropolitan Region with the implementation of environmentally sound measures. It is financed by membership fees of share holders and cooperation partners.

History
Decisive for the establishment of an independent consultancy for Heidelberg and its municipalities was a gathering of the chamber of commerce, craftspeople, architects, homeowners' and tenants' associations as well as environmental organizations and public utilities named “Heidelberg Energy Round Table” (German: Heidelberger Energie-Tisch) during which it became obvious that climate protection measures had frequently failed because of short-term planning, funding shortfalls or a lack of available information. Heidelberg Energy Round Table developed the concept of a neutral and independent energy consultancy for the Rhine-Neckar Metropolitan Region which would remove those obstacles. The creation of KliBA was supported by the SAVE-II-Program initiated by the European Commission.

Organization
The municipalities Dossenheim, Edingen-Neckarhausen, Heidelberg, Neckargemünd and Sandhausen as well as the savings bank Heidelberg (German: Sparkasse Heidelberg) constituted the KliBA founding members. 
In the following rounds of enlargement, the cities Hemsbach, Ladenburg, Schriesheim, Sinsheim, Walldorf, Weinheim, Heddesheim, Hirschberg, Ilvesheim, Plankstadt, Rauenberg, Malsch and Mühlhausen joined the organization.
The cooperation partner Altlußheim, Bammental, Eppelheim, Gaiberg, Laudenbach, Leimen, St. Leon-Rot, Neulußheim, Nußloch, Schwetzingen, Wiesenbach and Wilhelmsfeld are currently in the process of becoming share holders. Altogether, the KliBA services are available to approximately 513.000 citizens in the Rhine-Neckar region.

Membership
KliBA is part of a network of 200 European energy agencies funded within the framework of the SAVE-II-Program ("SAVE-agencies"). On a national level, it is a member of the Federal association of energy and climate protection agencies (German: Bundesverband der Energie- und Klimaschutzagenturen Deutschlands (eaD)).

Services
The counseling interviews citizens receive on topics like insulation, renovation of old buildings, renewable energy and promotional programs are free of charge. Moreover, small and medium-sized companies are advised on reducing their energy costs and municipalities are assisted in the area of communal energy management.

Criticism
Independent energy consultants have feared that their chances of being awarded future contracts will be reduced due by the work of the KliBA.

References

External links

 KliBA Webpage
 Environmental Management in the city of Heidelberg
 German Energy Agency Webpage
 The European Association of local authorities inventing their energy future

Energy conservation in Germany